The Ricoh CX1 has been introduced by Ricoh in 2009. This is the first Ricoh camera to use a CMOS sensor. It allows it to operate at four frames/sec and perform hi-speed continuous shooting.

Major Specifications
 Type: Digital compact camera
 Sensor: 1/2.3-inch CMOS (total pixels: approx. 10.29 million pixels).
 Effective pixels: approximately 9.29 million pixels.
 Light sensitivity: up to ISO 1600
 Lens: 7.1x zoom f=4.95-35.4 mm (like 28-200mm for 35mm film)
 Macro: 1 cm
 Lens Construction: 10 elements in 7 groups (aspheric lens: 4 elements and 5 surfaces)
 Aperture: F3.3 (Wide) - F5.2 (Telephoto)
 Shooting aid: Image sensor shift method image stabilizer
 Shutter Speed: 8, 4, 2, 1 - 1/2000 sec.
Interval timer Shooting interval: 5 seconds to 2 hours (no limit to the number of pictures you can take or their resolution)
 Display: 3.0-inch Transparent LCD (approx. 920,000 dots)
 Flash: built-in automatic electronic flash
 Dimensions: 101.5 mm (W) x 58.3 mm (H) x 27.9 mm (D) (excluding projecting parts)
 Weight: Approx. 180 g (excluding battery, SD memory card, strap), Accessories approx. 23 g (battery, strap)

Reception
The Ricoh CX1 received a mainly favourable reception from independent reviewers.

Best4Reviews.com said that the CX1 was
"a highly specified, well crafted camera with a host of very clever features that really work. The Ricoh CX1 is however a machine for the more advanced user and offers image quality to match, for those that know what they’re doing."

IT Reviews concluded that:
"Ricoh has managed to pack a lot under the stylish hood of the CX1, including some welcome new features like very high-speed continuous shooting and increased dynamic range, plus multi-targeting AF and WB."

Notes

External links

In English
 Ricoh Official Website
 Ricoh GR Diary
 dpreview.com
 Camerapedia.org

In Spanish
 DSLR Magazine
 Foto Actualidad
 quesabesde.com

References
 Best4reviews.com CX1 review

SLR cameras
Ricoh digital cameras